James Cantero Coitiño (born 7 February 1967) is a Uruguayan former football striker and player's agent.

Career
Born in Paso de los Toros, Tacuarembó, Cantero began playing football in the Uruguayan Primera División with Independiente Flores at age 16. Two years later, he joined Montevideo-based side Defensor Sporting Club. He also played for Rampla Juniors before moving to Costa Rica to play for Club Sport Uruguay de Coronado.

In August 1990, Cantero joined Segunda División side UE Lleida, where the 23-year-old would lead the club with 17 league goals. After one season, Real Murcia signed Cantero, in January 1992. Cantero scored 41 goals for Murcia, including 25 goals during the 1992–93 Segunda División B season.

Cantero next embarked on a journeyman's career, playing for Sport Boys in Peru, Correcaminos UAT in Mexico, as well as clubs in El Salvador, Honduras and United Arab Emirates. He finished his career in the Segunda División B with Lorca Deportiva.

Retirement
After he retired from playing football, Cantero became a player's agent and also acts as a consultant for Mexican club CF Pachuca.
The famous Uruguayan writer Eduardo Galeano tells a thrilling story involving the player and the writer himself in his latest book entitled "The Hunter Stories" pages 218 and 219

Personal
Cantero's son, Adrian, is also a footballer who plays for CF Pachuca's youth teams.

References

External links
 
 

1967 births
Living people
Uruguayan footballers
Uruguayan expatriate footballers
Uruguayan Primera División players
Liga MX players
Segunda División players
Segunda División B players
Defensor Sporting players
Rampla Juniors players
Huracán Buceo players
UE Lleida players
Real Murcia players
Lorca Deportiva CF footballers
Sport Boys footballers
Correcaminos UAT footballers
Expatriate footballers in Costa Rica
Expatriate footballers in Spain
Expatriate footballers in Mexico
Association football forwards